J. Martin Burke is an American legal scholar and Regents Professor Emeritus of Law at the University of Montana.

Books
Introduction to the Taxation of Business Organizations and Choice of Entity
Taxation of Individual Income
Taxation of Partnerships and Limited Liability Companies Taxed as Partnerships
Understanding Federal Income Taxation

References 

American legal scholars
University of Montana faculty
Living people

Year of birth missing (living people)